The 1986 Colorado State Rams football team represented Colorado State University in the 1986 NCAA Division I-A football season as a member of the Western Athletic Conference (WAC). In its fifth season under head coach Leon Fuller, the team compiled a 6–5 record overall and 4–4 mark against WAC opponents. Colorado State's senior quarterback, Kelly Stouffer, passed for 2,604 yards and 7 touchdown's.

Other statistical leaders on the 1986 Colorado State team included Steve Bartalo with 1,419 rushed yards and J. D. Brookhart with 581 receiving yards.

Schedule

Roster

Team players in the NFL

References

Colorado State
Colorado State Rams football seasons
Colorado State Rams football